AARGH (Artists Against Rampant Government Homophobia) was a 76-page one-off comics anthology published by Mad Love in 1988.

The comic was designed to aid the fight against Clause 28, which was a controversial amendment to the Local Government Act 1988, a British law which was designed to outlaw the "promotion of homosexuality" by local authorities. At that time Alan Moore, who was in a relationship with his wife and their girlfriend, felt that the law was heterosexist and that it would obviously affect them personally. To help their fight Moore formed Mad Love, his own publishing company, to release AARGH.

The title was a mixed collection of almost 40 stories, mostly comics with some text pieces. Moore himself contributed an eight-page story called "The Mirror of Love", with Steve Bissette and Rick Veitch providing art. Other creators included David Lloyd, Robert Crumb, Howard Cruse, Hunt Emerson, Neil Gaiman, Dave Gibbons, Los Bros Hernandez, Garry Leach, Dave McKean, Frank Miller, Harvey Pekar, Savage Pencil, Bill Sienkiewicz, Dave Sim, Posy Simmonds, Art Spiegelman, Alexei Sayle, and Bryan Talbot.

Clause 28 was eventually repealed in 2003. Moore has also reworked "The Mirror of Love" with illustrator José Villarrubia for Top Shelf Productions.

External links

 The Mirror of Love at Top Shelf
 Bryan Talbot's contribution to AARGH! at the official Bryan Talbot fanpage
 AARGH page at MooreReppion.com (AARGHs for sale with all money going to Stonewall)

1988 comics debuts
1980s LGBT literature
British comics titles
Comics anthologies
LGBT-related comics
Comics publications
One-shot comic titles
LGBT literature in the United Kingdom